Wefunder is a crowdfunding service which connects startups with investors online. Wefunder uses a provision in the 2012 JOBS Act which allows unaccredited investors to purchase equity in early stage private companies.

Foundation 
Wefunder was founded by Nick Tommarello, Mike Norman, and Greg Belote in 2012. The startup incubator Y Combinator backed Wefunder during its development and launch. The company raised more than $500,000 in 2012, receiving startup capital from nearly 60 investors, including angel investors Nihal Mehta, Dharmesh Shah, and Bill Warner. As of 2019, the company has raised over $9.8 million from over 100 investors via the Wefunder platform. Annual fund rate increased to over  $200 million in 2021.

Function and reception 
Wefunder is predicated upon the idea that anyone, regardless of wealth, should be able to invest in a company. As of now, only accredited investors are legally able to fund startups, and these investors must put up at least $1,000 to have an equity share. Once the full deregulations promised by the JOBS Act are unrolled, the company plans to lower the barrier of investor entry to $100. Tommarello said Wefunder's goal is to “fill the funding gap between angel investors and that first major round of capital.”

See also 
 Coinbase
 GoFundMe
 Kickstarter
 Patreon

References

External links 
 

Crowdfunding platforms of the United States
Financial services companies established in 2011
Companies based in Cambridge, Massachusetts
Y Combinator companies
Equity crowdfunding platforms
2011 establishments in the United States